Munidopsidae is a family of crustaceans belonging to the order Decapoda.

Genera

Genera:
 Ambulocapsa Robins, Feldmann & Schweitzer, 2013
 Ankylokypha Robins, Feldmann & Schweitzer, 2013
 Aulavescus Robins, Feldmann & Schweitzer, 2013

References

Decapods